Robert Brendan Mahon (born January 17, 1995) is a former American football guard. He played college football at Penn State.

Early life & high school
Mahon was born in Livingston, New Jersey and grew up in nearby Randolph, where he attended Randolph High School. Mahon was a standout offensive lineman for the Rams, where he was an all-state selection as a junior and senior as well as being ranked in the ESPN 300 and the 4th-best college football prospect in New Jersey. Following his senior season, he was selected to play in the 2013 U.S. Army All-American Bowl and was a team captain in the game.

College career
Mahon played four seasons with the Nittany Lions, appearing 46 games (41 starts). Mahon moved from left to right tackle during his junior season and was named first-team All-Big Ten by Pro Football Focus. As a senior, Mahon received the Richard Maginnis Memorial Award as Penn State's most outstanding offensive lineman.

Professional career
Mahon signed with the Carolina Panthers as an undrafted free agent on April 28, 2018 and made the 53-man roster out of training camp. He made his NFL debut on September 16, 2018 against the Atlanta Falcons. He played in two games before being placed on injured reserve on December 6, 2018 with a concussion.

On June 5, 2019, the Panthers waived Mahon.

References

External links
Panthers bio
Penn State bio

1995 births
Living people
People from Livingston, New Jersey
People from Randolph, New Jersey
Sportspeople from Essex County, New Jersey
Sportspeople from Morris County, New Jersey
Players of American football from New Jersey
Randolph High School (New Jersey) alumni
American football offensive guards
Penn State Nittany Lions football players
Carolina Panthers players